The N5 road is one of the 7 national roads of Senegal. It connects the centre of Senegal to Basse Casamance in the south by a route which traverses the Gambia at the mouth of the River Gambia.

The road runs in a south-westerly direction from its junction with the N4 road at Kaolack via Sokone to the mouth of the River Gambia, where there is a ferry crossing to Banjul. 
From Banjul the road runs south-eastwards via Diouloulou to reconnect with the N4 at Bignona.

See also
 N1 road
 N2 road
 N3 road
 N4 road
 N6 road
 N7 road
 Transport in Senegal

Road transport in Senegal
Transport in the Gambia